The Revolutionary Council along with the Zanzibar House of Representatives make up the semi-autonomous Revolutionary Government of Zanzibar. The council's principal role is to advise the President of Zanzibar, who is the Head of government.

The council is made up of the following members.

 The President of Zanzibar, who is the Chairman of the Council 
 The 1st and 2nd Vice-Presidents
 All Ministers of the Revolutionary Government of Zanzibar
 Other members appointed by the President of Zanzibar

References

External links
 Cabinet of Zanzibar

Government of Zanzibar